Skuhraviana is a genus of midges in the family Cecidomyiidae. The one described species - Skuhraviana triangulifera - is found in the Holarctic region. The genus was established in 1963 by Soviet entomologist Boris Mamaev.

References

Cecidomyiidae genera

Insects described in 1963
Taxa named by Boris Mamaev
Monotypic Diptera genera